Deckenia may refer to:

Deckenia (plant), a genus of palm trees
Deckenia (crab), a genus of freshwater crabs